The Bonvouloir Islands are a group of uninhabited islands of Papua New Guinea. They are in the Louisiade Archipelago. The main islands are East Island, Panamole Island and Hastings Island

The islands are densely wooded and rocky, and Hastings Island has  cliffs and many caves.

References

Archipelagoes of Papua New Guinea
Islands of Milne Bay Province
Louisiade Archipelago
Uninhabited islands of Papua New Guinea